Phaulernis statariella is a moth of the family Epermeniidae. It is found in France, Austria, Switzerland, Italy, Bosnia and Herzegovina, Slovakia and Poland.

The larvae feed on Laserpitium siler.

References

Moths described in 1863
Taxa named by Carl von Heyden
Epermeniidae
Moths of Europe